Galati Mamertino is a comune (municipality) in the Metropolitan City of Messina in the Italian region Sicily, located about  east of Palermo and about  west of Messina.

Galati Mamertino borders the following municipalities: Frazzanò, Longi, San Salvatore di Fitalia, Tortorici.

People
 Antonio Lombardo (1891–1928)

References

External links
 Official website

Cities and towns in Sicily